Krampus, the "Christmas Devil" of Austrian and Bavarian folklore, has entered the popular culture of North America; Christian Jacobs notes that "thanks to the Internet and YouTube, [Krampus] is now very much on America's Christmas radar." Tanya Basu interprets this as part of a "growing movement of anti-Christmas celebrations": a "bah, humbug" rejection of – or novel alternative to – mainstream festivities. Brian Joines of Image Comics suspects that the reason Krampus (specifically, as well as dark aspects of Christmas in general) has not been historically popularized in America is a social artifact resulting from "the nature of how we view Christmas in this country, both as a big day for kids and as the birth of a big religious figurehead". In some North American depictions, Krampus is an antihero who seeks to prevent children from becoming spoiled by rampant consumerism flowing from the economics of Christmas.

Krampus is often mentioned in media related to Christmas, but the following lists instances where the character is featured significantly.

Krampus celebrations
 Krampus-related events are held in cities across North America.  Each may have a theme or cause, be it a simple bar crawl, toy drive, or a charity fundraiser. Below are a few:

 Krampusnacht Washington DC.
 Toronto Krampus Ball.
 Chicago Krampus Fest.
 LA Krampusfest.
 San Francisco Krampus Krawl.
 Dallas Krampus Society.
 Krampuslauf Philadelphia.
Krampusnacht St. Louis, MO.

Costumes
Costumed characters are a central part of all Krampus celebrations.  These characters include: Krampus, Saint Nikolaus, the woodsman, angels, and the old woman.  As Krampus is half-goat and half-demon, the costume normally shares certain primary elements such as: a fur suit, horns, demon mask, and hooves. Props commonly used are; bells, a birch switch, basket worn on the back, chains, walking staff, and a horse hair or hemp flogger.  The most traditional Krampus costumes are made from goat/sheep skins, animal horns, and hand carved masks.  More often they are made with modern and less costly materials, such as: fake fur and latex masks.  Several Krampus costume instructional YouTube videos are available.

Film
Krampus: The Christmas Devil: a direct-to-video horror film (2013).
vom Krampus: zwischen Latexhaut und Schaffell: video-documentary film (2013).
 Krampus: The Reckoning: a direct-to-video horror film (2015).
 A Christmas Horror Story: an anthology horror film (2015), where Krampus is played by Rob Archer in his monster form, while Amy Forsyth and Julian Richings appear as human characters who transform into him.
 Krampus: a horror comedy (2015) from Universal Pictures, where Krampus is physically portrayed by Luke Hawker and voiced by Gideon Emery.
 Krampus: The Devil Returns: a direct-to-video horror sequel to Krampus: The Christmas Devil (2016).
 Krampus Unleashed: a direct-to-video horror film (2016).
 Mother Krampus: a direct-to-video horror film (2017).
 Mother Krampus 2: a direct-to-video horror film (2018).
 Krampus origins: a direct-to-video horror film (2018).
 Slay Belles: a direct-to-video horror film (2018).

In production
 Anti-Claus (initially titled Comes the Krampus), from Kevin Smith.
 Happy Krampus!, from Walden Media and The Jim Henson Company.

Television
 G4 commercial (2003). Christmas carolers outside a house sing a dirge about Krampus, who has entered to punish the naughty children inside.
 The Colbert Report segment "The Blitzkrieg on Grinchitude - Hallmark & Krampus" (2009), regarding the so-called 'War on Christmas'.
 "The Devil of Christmas" (2016), an episode of Inside No. 9 features the figure.

Animation
 The Venture Brothers episode "A Very Venture Christmas" (2004). While looking for a Christmas story to read aloud at the annual Venture Compound Christmas Party, Hank and Dean unwittingly summon the Krampus from one of Dr. Orpheus's grimoires.
 Scooby-Doo! Mystery Incorporated episode "Wrath of the Krampus" (2012). Voiced by Carlos Alazraqui.
 American Dad! episode "Minstrel Krampus" (2013). Voiced by Danny Glover with the singing voice provided by Charles Bradley.
 The Robot Chicken episode "The Robot Chicken Christmas Special: The X-Mas United" features Krampus as Santa's opponent on a college debate tour in 2002. Both Santa and Krampus have sex with a groupie, but Krampus does not use a condom and fathers "The Nerd", a recurring Robot Chicken character. The episode was first broadcast on December 13, 2015 on the Adult Swim programming block of the Cartoon Network. In the next season, the episode "Freshly Baked: The Robot Chicken Santa Claus Pot Cookie Freakout Special: Special Edition" features Krampus as the leader of a rock band called "Krampus". It was first broadcast on December 10, 2017, on Adult Swim. In the next season, the episode "Robot Chicken's Santa's Dead (Spoiler Alert) Holiday Murder Thing Special" features Krampus as a suspect in the murder of Santa Claus, who was later revealed to be Tim Allen in a Santa costume.
 In one Teen Titans Go! episode titled Welcome to Halloween, the Krampus is a major character.

Live action
 The League episode "A Krampus Carol" (2012).
 The Aquabats! Super Show! episode "Christmas with The Aquabats!" (2013). Voiced by Robert Smigel.
 Grimm episode "Twelve Days of Krampus" (2013). Depicted as a man who annually transforms into Krampus (Derek Mears) to kidnap and eat "naughty" children on Christmas.
 Lost Girl episode "Groundhog Fae" (2013).
 Murdoch Mysteries episode "A Merry Murdoch Christmas" (2015, season 9). A sighting of Krampus is reported on the night a philanthropist dressed as Santa is murdered at a Christmas Gala. Inspector Brackenreid has a nightmare of his boyhood encounter with Krampus.
 "The Santa Clauses" Episode 5 has Krampus amongst all the past Santas Simon Calvin sees in the Yuleverse.

Print media
Krampus: The Devil of Christmas (2004), by Monte Beauchamp collects early 1900s Krampus postcards
Art director and graphic designer Monte Beauchamp published Krampus postcards from the 19th and 20th centuries in his magazine BLAB! after being introduced to them by a collector. He then had two books of Krampus postcards published in 2004 and 2010. An exhibit was mounted in a gallery in Santa Monica, and a friend of Beauchamp's opened a Krampus-themed club in Los Angeles.
Chickenhare graphic novel (2006), had a Krampus named Banjo as one of the main characters.
 Krampus: The Yule Lord novel (2012), by Gerald Brom set in Boone County, West Virginia.
Klaus, a graphic novel by Grant Morrison.
Krampus: Shadow of Saint Nicholas, a 2015 graphic novel released by Legendary Entertainment as a tie-in with the 2015 Krampus film.
Of Christmas Present, Thomm Quackenbush's 2014 novelette has Krampus try to have an alcoholic Salvation Army Santa be the new Santa.

Others
 CarnEvil arcade game (1998), has a "freakishly evil St. Nick" boss named Krampus.
 Random Spirit Lover album (2007), by the Canadian indie band Sunset Rubdown, features a picture of Krampus on the back cover. Spencer Krug stated that it was placed there because "he represents the sort of duality that's a theme on the record, the two sides of every thing."
 The single "Naughty Christmas" (2016) by Italian band Lacuna Coil mentions Krampus repeatedly throughout the song.
Krampus: A Yuletide Tale, a musical by Carrie Gilchrist (book, lyrics) and Nils-Petter Ankarblom (book, music, lyrics), was first produced at Short North Stage in Columbus, Ohio in December 2015.
 In the Doctor Who audio drama series Ravenous (2018), the two-part "Better Watch Out" and "Fairytale of Salzburg" sees the Eighth Doctor and his companions attend a Christmas celebration in Salzburg, only for a mysterious wish-granting entity to grant a wish that makes the Krampus real. As the Krampus (Robert Whitelock) nearly sends the whole city to Hell, the Doctor's companion Helen Sinclair is able to find the original Saint Nicholas (Raad Rawi) and bring him to the present so that he can command the Krampus to depart, as tradition states that only Saint Nick can command the Krampus.
Overwatch, an online video game by Blizzard Entertainment, features a customized Krampus skin for the character Junkrat in their "Overwatch Winter Wonderland" event.

 Rare Exports: A Christmas Tale (2010), a Finnish thriller film about finding the source of the original Santa Claus myth; a supernatural being who, rather than rewarding good children, punishes the naughty.
Santa
 Jack Frost who is usually depicted as just mischievous, malevolent monsters associated with Christmas in North American popular culture.
 Bogeymen from Babes in Toyland
 Santa Claus'' (1959) from Mexico features a demon who ineptly attempts to ruin Christmas.
 In a 2022 episode of The Family Histories Podcast, Krampus suddenly breaks into host Andrew Martin's garage where he keeps his time machine. Krampus is soon knocked unconscious by the 19th Century Hungarian poet and revolutionary Sándor Petőfi, and they learn that he is carrying a scroll listing the show's naughty guests. Krampus is zapped back into time to a random date.

References
Informational notes

Citations

 
Christmas-related lists
Fiction about monsters
Topics in popular culture